Naogaon Zilla School is a government-funded all boys school for grades 3 to 10 in Naogaon, Bangladesh.

Campus
The campus of this institution covers an area of 2 acres. The academic building is I-shaped. It is a three-storied building. There is a library, an auditorium and a prayer room. There is also a large playground. A small hostel is situated in the school compound which is hardly used.

Admission
In January, the school takes students in class III, V, VI and IX. The intake is class III-140, V-140, Class VI-140 and Class IX-60. Students have to qualify in a highly competitive admission test in order to get admitted to this school. Only 15% of the total applicants can be admitted to the school. The teachers of this institution are appointed directly by the government of Bangladesh through an Associate Teacher Recruitment Examination taken throughout the country.

See also
 List of Zilla Schools of Bangladesh

References

External links

 Official website

Schools in Naogaon District
1917 establishments in India
Educational institutions established in 1917